Charles Strickland may refer to:
 Sir Charles Strickland, 8th Baronet (1819-1909), barrister and rower
Charles H. Strickland (1916–1988), general superintendent in the Church of the Nazarene
Charles Strickland (town planner), local agent and town planner in County Mayo for Lord Dillon
The main character in the 1919 novel by William Somerset Maugham, The Moon and Sixpence

See also
 Charles Stickland (born 1968), senior Royal Marines officer